Don Mariano Marcos Avenue is a former street name that may refer to:

 Quezon Avenue, a major thoroughfare in Quezon City
 Commonwealth Avenue, a major thoroughfare in Quezon City